Quaid e Azam Medical College (or QAMC) is a medical college in Bahawalpur, Pakistan.

History
Quaid e Azam Medical College was founded on 2 December 1971 when its foundation stone was laid by the then Governor of Punjab, Lt Gen Attique-ur-Rehman (retd). The college is affiliated for clinical training to Bahawal Victoria Hospital & Civil Hospital Bahawalpur as well. The founding Principal was Prof Dr Nawab Muhammad Khan. Prof. Dr. Shafqat Ali Tabassum is the current principal of the college.

Architecture
Designed by Abdur Rahman Hye, it was the first endogenously designed Medical Campus by a Pakistani Architect and has the characteristics typical in A. R. Hye's style of architecture.
 
The design of the building incorporates natural climate control features, such as cross-ventilation, strategic placement of windows, and overhangs and courtyards to create shade. Additionally, the roof vaults, besides providing insulation, also allow the flow of air through the vault roof, bringing down ceiling temperatures. Hollow walls also provide insulation. This provides a natural protection against the hot and dry climate of Bahawalpur.

Recognition and affiliations
The college is recognized by the following organizations:

Pakistan Medical and Dental Council
 University of Health Sciences, Lahore

Societies and Clubs
Quaidians Dramatics Club And Movie Society(QDCAMS)
Iqra Medical Society
Quaidians Literary Society (QLS)

Notable alumni
Ashu Lal Faqeer, famous Seraiki poet
Syed Waseem Akhtar, Member of Provincial Assembly of Punjab

Gallery

References

External links 

Universities and colleges in Bahawalpur
Medical colleges in Punjab, Pakistan
1971 establishments in Pakistan
Memorials to Muhammad Ali Jinnah